The Icelandic Men's Football Cup ( - Mjólkurbikarinn) is a knock-out football cup competition in Iceland.  The final is played at Laugardalsvöllur in mid-September. The winners qualify for the UEFA Europa League. The tournament was first played in 1960. Víkingur are winners of 2021.

Winners

1960: KR
1961: KR
1962: KR
1963: KR
1964: KR
1965: Valur
1966: KR
1967: KR
1968: ÍBV
1969: ÍBA
1970: Fram
1971: Víkingur
1972: ÍBV
1973: Fram
1974: Valur
1975: Keflavik
1976: Valur
1977: Valur
1978: ÍA
1979: Fram
1980: Fram
1981: ÍBV
1982: ÍA
1983: ÍA
1984: ÍA
1985: Fram
1986: ÍA
1987: Fram
1988: Valur
1989: Fram
1990: Valur
1991: Valur
1992: Valur
1993: ÍA
1994: KR
1995: KR
1996: ÍA
1997: Keflavik
1998: ÍBV
1999: KR
2000: ÍA
2001: Fylkir
2002: Fylkir
2003: ÍA
2004: Keflavik
2005: Valur
2006: Keflavik
2007: FH
2008: KR
2009: Breiðablik
2010: FH
2011: KR
2012: KR
2013: Fram
2014: KR
2015: Valur
2016: Valur
2017: ÍBV
2018: Stjarnan
2019: Víkingur
2020: abandoned because of the Coronavirus pandemic
2021: Víkingur
2022: Víkingur

Performance by club

Lost finals by club

References

External links
 Icelandic FA  
 Eufo 
  League321.com - National cup results. 
 Iceland - List of Cup Finals, RSSSF.com
  IcelandFootball.net - National cup results. 

Iceland
1